The 1843 Massachusetts gubernatorial election was held on November 13, 1843.

Incumbent Democratic Governor Marcus Morton was defeated by Whig nominee George N. Briggs.

Since no candidate received a majority in the popular vote, Briggs was elected by the Massachusetts Senate per the state constitution.

General election

Candidates
Marcus Morton, Democratic, incumbent Governor
George N. Briggs, Whig, former U.S. Representative
Samuel E. Sewall, Liberty

Results

Legislative election
As no candidate received a majority of the vote, the Massachusetts House of Representatives was required nominate two of the four top vote-getters to the Massachusetts Senate, which then chose one of the two as Governor. The House nominated Briggs and Morton. The election in the Senate was held on January 8, 1844.

Notes

References

Bibliography 
 

1843
Massachusetts
Gubernatorial